Fifth Down Game could refer to:

 Fifth Down Game (1940), Dartmouth vs. Cornell
 Fifth Down Game (1990), Colorado vs. Missouri